Canada is divided into six time zones. Most areas of the country's provinces and territories operate on standard time from the first Sunday in November to the second Sunday in March and daylight saving time the rest of the year.

The division between time zones are based on proposals by Scottish Canadian railway engineer Sandford Fleming, who pioneered the use of the 24-hour clock, the world's time zone system, and a standard prime meridian.

Official time 

The National Research Council (NRC) maintains Canada's official time through the use of atomic clocks. The official time is specified in legislation passed by the individual provinces. In Quebec it is based on coordinated universal time. The other provinces use mean solar time. The NRC provides both coordinated universal time and mean solar time in its signals. It makes time servers available for direct synchronization with computers. The Canadian Broadcasting Corporation has aired a daily time signal, the National Research Council Time Signal, since November 5, 1939.

Time notation 

The Government of Canada recommends use of the 24-hour clock (e.g. ), which is widely used in contexts such as transportation schedules, parking meters, and data transmission. Speakers of Canadian French predominantly use this system, but most Canadian English speakers use the 12-hour clock in everyday speech (e.g. ), even when reading from a 24-hour display, similar to the use of the 24-hour clock in the United Kingdom.

Zones

Pacific Time Zone

Pacific Standard Time (PST) GMT−08:00 and Pacific Daylight Time (PDT) GMT−07:00:
 British Columbia (most of the province)

Mountain Time Zone

Mountain Standard Time (MST) GMT−07:00 and Mountain Daylight Time (MDT) GMT−06:00:
Alberta
 British Columbia, southeastern
Columbia-Shuswap Regional District east of the Selkirk Mountains
Regional District of East Kootenay
Regional District of Central Kootenay east of the Kootenay River and some parts east of Kootenay Lake that are south of and including Riondel (but not Creston, which observes MST year-round, and Kootenay Bay)
Northwest Territories, except for Tungsten (see above), two fishing lodges in the southeast and a mine site in the southwest
 Nunavut
 west of 102° West, and
 all communities in the Kitikmeot Region
 Saskatchewan
 Lloydminster and surrounding area (the municipal government chose to unify the entire city with Alberta's time zone)
Mountain Standard Time (MST) GMT−07:00 year-round:
 Yukon
 British Columbia, northeastern
 Northern Rockies Regional Municipality
 most of Peace River Regional District (except Fort Ware), including Dawson Creek
 British Columbia, southeastern
 Creston

Central Time Zone

Central Standard Time (CST) GMT−06:00 and Central Daylight Time CDT GMT−05:00:
Manitoba
 Saskatchewan
 Creighton (unofficial)
 Nunavut
 between 85° West and 102° West, and
 Resolute plus all communities in the Kivalliq Region and the west shore of Hudson Bay except Southampton Island (Coral Harbour)
 Ontario, northwestern
 west of 90° West (except the Atikokan, New Osnaburgh and Pickle Lake areas, and the Shebandowan and Upsala areas)
 east of 90° West: Big Trout Lake area
Central Standard Time (CST) GMT−06:00 year-round:
Saskatchewan (most of the province) (see Lloydminster, and Creighton, above)

Eastern Time Zone

Eastern Standard Time (EST) GMT−05:00 and Eastern Daylight Time (EDT) GMT−04:00:
 Nunavut
 east of 85° West, and
 all communities in the Qikiqtaaluk Region except Resolute
 Ontario
 east of 90° West (except the Big Trout Lake area), plus
 west of 90° West: Shebandowan and Upsala areas
 Quebec (most of province)
 Areas of Labrador adjacent to Schefferville (in Quebec but very close to the Labrador border) observe EST and DST unofficially.
Eastern Standard Time (EST) GMT−05:00 year-round:
 Nunavut
 entire Southampton Island (Coral Harbour)
 Ontario
 west of 90° West: Atikokan area and New Osnaburgh / Pickle Lake area

Atlantic Time Zone

Atlantic Standard Time (AST) GMT−04:00 and Atlantic Daylight Time (ADT) GMT−03:00:
 Labrador (all but the southeastern tip)
 New Brunswick
 Nova Scotia
 Prince Edward Island
 Quebec (Magdalen Islands and Listuguj Mi'gmaq First Nation)
Atlantic Standard Time (AST) UTC−04:00 year-round:
 Quebec (east of the Natashquan River)

Newfoundland Time Zone

Newfoundland Standard Time (NST) GMT−03:30 and Newfoundland Daylight Time (NDT) GMT−02:30:
 Labrador (southeastern)
 Newfoundland

Former time zones
 The Yukon Time Zone (GMT−09:00) covered Yukon from 1900 until 1966. In 1983, the zone (then covering only a small portion of Alaska) was restructured to cover most of Alaska and renamed the Alaska Time Zone.
 In 1988, Newfoundland observed "double daylight saving time" from April 3 until October 30, meaning that the time was set ahead by 2 hours. All of Newfoundland and southern Labrador, which observes GMT−03:30 as its standard time zone, observed GMT−01:30. This only happened in 1988 and the province now only adjusts its time by one hour for daylight saving time.

Daylight saving time

Four Canadian cities, by local ordinance, observed daylight saving time in 1916. Brandon, Manitoba, adopted it on April 17. It was followed by Winnipeg on April 23, Halifax on April 30, and Hamilton, Ontario, on June 4. Port Arthur, Ontario, was the first place in the world to introduce it, on July 1, 1908.

Daylight saving time is currently observed in nine of ten provinces and two of three territories, but with exceptions in several provinces and Nunavut. Most of the province of Saskatchewan, despite geographically being in the Mountain Time Zone, observes year-round CST. In 2020, the territory of Yukon abandoned seasonal time change and moved to permanently observing MST year-round. Under the Constitution of Canada, laws related to timekeeping are a purely provincial matter. In practice, since the late 1960s DST across Canada has been closely or completely synchronized with its observance in the United States to promote consistent economic and social interaction. When the United States extended DST in 1987 to the first Sunday in April, all DST-observing Canadian provinces followed suit to mimic the change.

In 2019, the legislature of British Columbia began the process of eliminating the practice of observing daylight saving time in the province. On October 31, 2019, the government introduced Bill 40 in the legislature, which would define "Pacific Time" as "7 hours behind Coordinated Universal Time (UTC)". In a press release, the provincial government stated an intention to maintain alignment of clock time with Washington, Oregon, California, and Yukon. The move follows a consultation earlier in 2019, in which the province received over 223,000 responses, 93% of which said they would prefer year-round DST as compared to the status quo of changing the clocks twice a year. The premier of British Columbia discussed the issue with Yukon premier Sandy Silver, who said in October that he needs more consultation with Yukon stakeholders, and with Alberta and Alaska.

The latest United States change (Energy Policy Act of 2005) to daylight saving time, adding parts of March and November to when daylight saving time is observed, which began in 2007 was adopted by the various provinces and territories on the following dates:
 Ontario and Manitoba – October 20, 2005
 Quebec – December 5, 2005
 Prince Edward Island – December 6, 2005
 New Brunswick – December 23, 2005
 Alberta – February 2, 2006
 Northwest Territories – March 4, 2006
 British Columbia – March 31, 2006
 Nova Scotia – April 25, 2006
 Yukon – July 14, 2006. Year-round MST as of March 8, 2020.
 Newfoundland and Labrador – November 20, 2006, but officially announced on January 18, 2007
 Nunavut – February 19, 2007
 Saskatchewan – No official action was taken, as almost all of the province remains on CST year-round. However, the few places in the province that do observe daylight saving (Lloydminster and the surrounding area, which straddles the Alberta border and observes Alberta's Mountain Timeand Creighton, which observes daylight saving on an unofficial basis due to its proximity to the border with Manitoba) follow the aforementioned March–November schedule just like the other provinces and territories.

IANA time zone database

Data for Canada from zone.tab of the IANA time zone database. Columns marked with * are the columns from zone.tab itself.

See also
 Lists of time zones
 Newfoundland's Daylight Saving Act of 1917
 1972 British Columbia time plebiscite
 Effects of time zones on North American broadcasting
 National Research Council Time Signal
 Date and time notation in Canada

Notes

References

External links
It's about TIME
Saskatchewan time system
Canadian time zone maps
Official Times across Canada
North American Time zone maps and border data

 
Geography of Canada
Canada